The Hendrik W. Bode Lecture Prize is an award given by the IEEE Control Systems Society (CSS) to recognize distinguished contributions to control systems science or engineering. It was established in 1989, named after Hendrik W. Bode (1905–1982), a pioneer of modern control theory and system engineering, who revolutionized both the content and methodology of his chosen fields of research during his long career at Bell Labs and Harvard University. 

The recipient of the award gives a plenary lecture at the annual IEEE Conference on Decision and Control (CDC). The inaugural Bode Prize Lecture was delivered by Gunter Stein at the 28th IEEE CDC in Tampa, Florida, on December 15, 1989.

Recipients

 1989: Gunter Stein
 1990: David Luenberger
 1991: Petar V. Kokotovic
 1992: Brian D.O. Anderson
 1993: Michael Athans
 1994: Gene F. Franklin
 1995: Kumpati S. Narendra
 1996: Jurgen Ackermann
 1997: Edward J. Davison
 1998: J. Boyd Pearson
 1999: Graham C. Goodwin
 2000: Mathukumalli Vidyasagar
 2001: Alberto Isidori
 2002: Eduardo D. Sontag
 2003: Lennart Ljung
 2004: Tamer Başar
 2005: Pravin Varaiya
 2006: Arthur J. Krener
 2007: P. S. Krishnaprasad
 2008: Christopher Byrnes
 2009: Peter E. Caines
 2010: Manfred Morari
 2011: John Baillieul
 2012: Jessy W. Grizzle
 2013: B. Ross Barmish
 2014: Bruce Francis
 2015: Hassan Khalil
 2016: Richard M. Murray
 2017: Naomi Ehrich Leonard
 2018: Mark W. Spong
 2019: 
 2020: Kristin Y. Pettersen
 2021: Pramod Khargonekar
 2022: David J. Hill

See also

 List of people in systems and control
 List of engineering awards
 IEEE Control Systems Award
 Giorgio Quazza Medal
 Richard E. Bellman Control Heritage Award
 Rufus Oldenburger Medal

References

Systems sciences awards